Central Sanskrit University, formerly Rashtriya Sanskrit Sansthan, is a central university located in New Delhi, India, to promote Sanskrit. Established in 1970, it functions under the Ministry of Human Resource Development, Government of India. It offers B.A., B.Ed., M.A., M.Ed., and Ph.D. programs and offers a distance learning program in Sanskrit. In March 2020, the Indian Parliament passed the Central Sanskrit Universities Act, 2020 to upgrade it from deemed to be university status to central university status, along with two other universities Shri Lal Bahadur Shastri National Sanskrit University and National Sanskrit University.

See also
 Sanskrit revival

References

External links
 

Central universities in India
Sanskrit universities in India
Universities in Delhi
New Delhi
Educational institutions established in 1970
1970 establishments in Delhi